Romano Bilenchi (9 November 1909 – 18 November 1989) was an Italian novelist, short story writer and essayist. He was born in Siena. He was involved with the resistance movement during the Fascist rule of Benito Mussolini. He was also active in the Italian Communist Party after the war. He founded a magazine, Società, together with Cesare Luporini and Ranuccio Bianchi Bandinelli in 1945.

As a writer, Bilenchi published novels, short stories and essays. He won the Viareggio Prize in 1972. His literary friends included major 20th-century figures like Eugenio Montale and Ezra Pound.

He died in Florence in 1989.

Works

Fiction
Vita di Pisto, Torino, Il Selvaggio, 1931.
Cronaca dell'Italia meschina, ovvero Storia dei socialisti di Colle, Firenze, Vallecchi, 1933.
Il capofabbrica. Racconti, Roma, Circoli, 1935.
Mio cugino Andrea, Firenze, Vallecchi, 1936.
Anna e Bruno e altri racconti, Firenze, Parenti, 1938.
Conservatorio di Santa Teresa, Firenze, Vallecchi, 1940.
La siccità:racconti, Firenze, Edizioni di rivoluzione, 1941; nuova ed. , binomiale: La Siccita'-La Miseria , Firenze, Vallecchi, 1944.
Dino e altri racconti, Firenze, Vallecchi, 1942.
Racconti, Firenze, Vallecchi, 1958.
Una città, Galatina (Lecce), Pajano, 1958.
Il bottone di Stalingrado, Firenze, Vallecchi, 1972.
Il processo di Mary Dugan e altri racconti, Torino, Einaudi, 1972.
La rosa non finita, Firenze, Pananti, 1980.
Il gelo, Milano, Rizzoli, 1982. Translated as The Chill
Gli anni impossibili, contiene:  La siccità, La miseria, Il gelo, Milano, Rizzoli, 1984. .
Pomeriggio. Due racconti, Siena, Taccuini di Barbablù, 1985.
I tedeschi. Racconto, Milano, All'insegna del pesce d'oro, 1985. .
L'attentato, Firenze, Pananti, 1986.
Maria, Prato, Comune di Prato, 1986.
Due ucraini e altri amici, Milano, Rizzoli, 1990. .

References

1909 births
1989 deaths
Writers from Siena
20th-century Italian novelists
20th-century Italian male writers
Viareggio Prize winners
Italian magazine founders